Ilie Iordache (born 23 March 1985 in București) is a Romanian former footballer who played as a midfielder, most recently for German club FC Holzhausen.

Career
Iordache started his professional career at CSM Reșița in 2003. Iordache was sold to Universitatea Craiova making there his debut on Liga I against Gloria Bistriţa. During 2005–06, Iordache signed for Dinamo București II, he was a mainstay in the starting 11 and was regularly playing as an attacking midfielder. Iordache also scored the goal which won the derby against their rivals FC Rapid Bucharest.

Iordache then transferred to Pandurii Târgu Jiu agreeing to a 3-year contract, being their greatest signing in the summer 2006. Iordache scored on his debut against Craiova. Iordache also scored the winning goal against Rapid Bucharest in the cup final. Iordache did not resign his contract since he is ready to play abroad.

On 17 June, Iordache signed a 3-year contract with AEK.

At the start of 2010, Rapid completed the loan deal that will bring Iordache (back in Romania, at least until the end of the season. Iordache has a contract with AEK Athens that will only expire in 2012, but the player seems to have realized that he has slim chances to play regular there and spoke about the possibility of a permanent deal. On 19 July 2010 Iordache released on a free by AEK.

Iordache previously played for Romania squads U-17 and U-19.

References

External links
 

1986 births
Living people
Footballers from Bucharest
Romanian footballers
Romanian expatriate footballers
CSM Reșița players
Faur București players
FC U Craiova 1948 players
CS Pandurii Târgu Jiu players
FC Rapid București players
AEK Athens F.C. players
ACF Gloria Bistrița players
CS Concordia Chiajna players
ASA 2013 Târgu Mureș players
AFC Săgeata Năvodari players
Expatriate footballers in Greece
Super League Greece players
Liga I players
Romanian expatriate sportspeople in Greece
Association football midfielders